Yaylıca is a village in the Batman District of Batman Province in Turkey. The village is populated by Kurds of the Elîkan tribe and had a population of 52 in 2021.

The hamlet of Dereüstü is attached to the village.

References 

Villages in Batman District
Kurdish settlements in Batman Province